Henry James Hobbs Okey (28 May 1857 – 13 September 1918) was a Reform Party Member of Parliament in New Zealand.

Early life and family
Born in New Plymouth in 1857, Okey was the son of Edward Okey, an ironmonger. His brothers included Edward Nelson Okey, who in 1880 won what later became known as the Ballinger Belt for the New Zealand champion shot.

On 2 July 1884, Okey married Louisa Morey.

Political career

Okey was a member of the Taranaki County Council, and served as its chairman between 1896 and 1905. He was also vice president and then president of the Taranaki Agricultraul and Pastoral Society.

Okey contested the Taranaki electorate at the 1905 general election, coming second, 236 votes behind the incumbent, Edward Smith. However, Smith died in 1907 and Okey won the subsequent by-election as an independent. He gave sympathy and support to the Reform Party, and later formally became a Reform MP. Okey held the Taranaki seat until his death in 1918.

Death
Okey died in New Plymouth on 13 September 1918, and was buried in Te Henui Cemetery.

References

|-

1857 births
1918 deaths
Reform Party (New Zealand) MPs
Members of the New Zealand House of Representatives
People from New Plymouth
New Zealand MPs for North Island electorates
Unsuccessful candidates in the 1905 New Zealand general election
Burials at Te Henui Cemetery
Local politicians in New Zealand
20th-century New Zealand politicians